°

vijay College of Engineering and Technology'  is a College of Engineering that is located in Edayarnatham, Mannargudi, Tiruvarur, Tamil Nadu.

Affiliations
This college is currently affiliated with Anna University of Technology, Tiruchirappalli

References 

Engineering colleges in Tamil Nadu
Colleges affiliated to Anna University
Tiruvarur district